Zagorica pri Čatežu is a small settlement south of Čatež in the Municipality of Trebnje in eastern Slovenia. The area is part of the historical region of Lower Carniola. The municipality is now included in the Southeast Slovenia Statistical Region.

Name
The name of the settlement was changed from Zagorica to Zagorica pri Čatežu in 1953.

References

External links
Zagorica pri Catezu at Geopedia

Populated places in the Municipality of Trebnje